Tianlong Hotel is a cancelled  hotel skyscraper which was planned to have 73 storeys, in the Nanan District of Chongqing, China.

References

Skyscrapers in Chongqing